60 Minutes is an Australian version of the United States television newsmagazine show 60 Minutes, airing since 1979 on Sunday nights on the Nine Network. A New Zealand version uses segments of the show. The program is one of five inducted into Australia's television Logie Hall of Fame.

History 
The program was founded by veteran television producer Gerard Stone, who was appointed its inaugural executive producer in 1979 by media magnate Kerry Packer.

Stone devised it to be an Australian version of CBS's US Sixty Minutes program and it featured well known reporters Ray Martin, Ian Leslie and George Negus. Its prominent early programs included a 1981 interview Negus conducted with UK leader Margaret Thatcher, during which the prime minister aggressively countered his questions. Negus asked Thatcher why people described her as ''pig-headed'' and the Prime Minister demanded he tell her who, when and where such comments were made.

In 1982, Jana Wendt interviewed Libyan leader Muammar Gaddafi and asked him why he had been so often described as a terrorist, a butcher, a gangster and a madman.

In 2019, the program produced a report on the infiltration of organised crime into listed Australian casino firm Crown Resorts. It led to multiple state and federal inquiries, including the NSW Bergin Inquiry, that recommended Crown Resorts may be unfit to hold a casino licence.

In March 2021, the Nine Network launched a one hour one story studio-based 60 Minutes spin-off Under Investigation presented by Liz Hayes and produced by Gareth Harvey that features a panel of guests.

Staff

Current correspondents 
 Liz Hayes (1996–present)
 Tara Brown (2001–present)
 Tom Steinfort (2018, 2020–present)
 Amelia Adams (2022–present)

Former correspondents 
 George Negus (1979–1986)
 Ray Martin (1979–1984)
 Ian Leslie (1979–1989)
 Kate Baillieu (1979, resigned before show went to air)
 Jana Wendt (1982–1986, 1994)
 Jeff McMullen (1985–2000)
 Jennifer Byrne (1986–1993)
 Mike Munro (1986–1992)
 Richard Carleton † (1987–2006)
 Tracey Curro (1993–1997)
 Ellen Fanning (1999–2000)
 Paul Barry (2004–2005)
 Peter Harvey † (2003–2013)
 Michael Usher (2009–2016)
Ross Coulthart (2015-2018)
Charles Wooley (1993–2005, 2009–2019)
Liam Bartlett (2006–2012, 2015–2022)

Contributing reporters
 Peter Overton (2001–2009 full-time, 2009–present)
 Karl Stefanovic (2005–present)
 Ray Martin (2010–present)
 Deborah Knight (2020–present)
 Allison Langdon (2011–2017 full-time, 2018–present)
 Nick McKenzie (2019–present)
 Sarah Abo (2019–2022 fulltime, 2023–present)

Commentators 
 Paul Lyneham † (1996–2000)
 Peter Harvey † (2003–2013)

Executive producers

 Gerald Stone † (1979–1992)
 Kirsty Thomson (2016–present)

Awards 
60 Minutes has won numerous awards for broadcasting, including five Silver Logies, one Special Achievement Logie, and received nominations for a further six Logie awards. In 2018, 60 Minutes was inducted into the TV Week Logie Hall of Fame. In 2019, its report on the organised crime infiltration of gaming giant Crown Resorts was awarded a Walkley Award and led to two Royal Commissions. In 2020, its program on political malfeasance, The Faceless Man, was awarded a Walkley Award for best long format television reporting.

Controversies
In February 1988, 60 Minutes collaborated with James Randi to create a fictional psychic called "Carlos", played by José Alvarez, for an elaborate investigation into how much free publicity a fraudulent medium could garner through the Australian media, and how such people could manipulate the gullibility of vulnerable people. However, during their investigation and successful attempt at convincing the Australian media that "Carlos" was a genuinely notable medium who had a strong following in America, other Channel 9 programs were caught out reporting on the fake "Carlos" who appeared on Today and A Current Affair and was featured on Sunday and Nine News. An orchestrated incident where his assistant threw water on George Negus during a second appearance on Today garnered even more attention for "Carlos". When the sting was revealed on 60 Minutes, anger at the network was palpable and reports soon circulated about staff sackings as a result.

In April 2016, Tara Brown and eight other people (including three other staff members of Nine, David Ballment, Stephen Rice, and Ben Williamson) were arrested on allegations of child abduction in Beirut. According to Lebanese authorities, 60 Minutes allegedly paid $115,000 directly to the Child Abduction Recovery International Agency, despite claims that the exchange was made by the mother of the children. The abduction agency used has also been widely discredited, with fake recovery stories being posted on Facebook and their operators having been arrested all over the world. The recovery involved the team waiting in a parked car on the street and then snatching the children from their grandmother and nanny before driving away. "A Lebanese judicial source" told The Guardian that the group were to be charged with "armed abduction, purveying threats and physical harm" – crimes which carry sentences of twenty years' imprisonment with hard labour. The group were released from custody only after Nine paid a substantial money settlement to the father of the children the subject of the abduction attempt. This operation sparked wide debate about the ethics of the journalism being conducted.

In May 2019, a jury ruled that a 60 Minutes story aired in 2015 about the 2011 Grantham floods defamed four members of the Wagner family, from Toowoomba, Queensland, by implying they were responsible for the 12 deaths that occurred during the disaster. In November, a court ordered Channel Nine to pay $2.4 million plus $63,000 in interest to the family. Nick Cater, a journalist featured in the program, was ordered to pay an additional $1.2 million in damages. Justice Peter Applegarth, who was in charge of the case, stated that while Cater had information contradicting the program's allegations, he did not include them in the story. Applegarth also concluded that Channel Nine failed to inform the Wagners of the allegations until after the program had been publicised, and when the family did send a statement to Nine, they did not include it in the program.

See also

 List of Australian television series
 Journalism in Australia
 List of longest-running Australian television series

References

External links
 Australia's 60 Minutes official website
 

Australian television news shows
Nine News
1979 Australian television series debuts
1980s Australian television series
1990s Australian television series
2000s Australian television series
2010s Australian television series
60 Minutes
Television shows set in Sydney
English-language television shows
Australian television series based on American television series